90.1 Power Radio (DXKA 90.1 MHz) is an FM station owned and operated by Kaissar Broadcasting Network. The station's studio is located along Ochoa St., Brgy. Limaha, Butuan.

The station first went on air on January 31, 2014, as KA90 with a Soft AC format. At that time, its studios were located along Jose C. Aquino Ave. near the Police Regional Office XIII Headquarters. It went off the air sometime around late 2016. In January 2019, it went back on air, this time airing a mix of music, news and talk. In August 2020, it rebranded as Radyo Kaibigan.

References

External links
Power Radio Butuan FB Page

Radio stations in Butuan
Radio stations established in 2014